Brayan Boci (born 24 July 2003) is an Italian professional footballer of Albanian descent, who plays as a defender for  club Genoa.

Club career 

Born in San Giovanni Valdarno from Albanian parents, Boci played football in Genoa's youth sector, where he captained several sides and won a national under-18 title in 2021.

During the 2022–23 season, Boci started training regularly with the first team, following the temporary promotion of head coach Alberto Gilardino from the under-19 squad. On 26 December 2022, he made his professional debut, coming in as a substitute for Stefano Sabelli at the 76th minute of the league match against Bari, which ended in 2-1 win for his side. On 19 February 2023, Boci made his first professional start in a league match against Modena: however, he got injured during the first half of the game, being subsequently replaced with Domenico Criscito.

International career 

Thanks to his origins, Boci can represent both Italy and Albania internationally.

After taking part to a training camp with the Italian under-16 national team in 2019, he went on to feature for the under-19 team two years later.

Style of play 

Boci is predominantly a left-back, who can also play a centre-back or a left wing-back in a five-men midfield.

A left-footed player, he can support the attacking phase while covering defensively, thanks to his tackling and marking abilities.

Career statistics

References

External links 

 

2003 births
Living people
Italian footballers
Italy youth international footballers
Italian people of Albanian descent
Association football defenders
Serie B players
Genoa C.F.C. players